Suh Hyo-won or Seo Hyo-won (born May 10, 1987) is a South Korean table tennis player. She competed at the 2016 Summer Olympics in the women's singles event, in which she was eliminated in the fourth round by Cheng I-ching, and as part of the South Korean team in the women's team event.

Singles titles

References

1987 births
Living people
South Korean female table tennis players
Olympic table tennis players of South Korea
Table tennis players at the 2016 Summer Olympics
Table tennis players at the 2014 Asian Games
Table tennis players at the 2018 Asian Games
Asian Games medalists in table tennis
Asian Games bronze medalists for South Korea
Medalists at the 2018 Asian Games
South Korean expatriate sportspeople in China
Expatriate table tennis people in Japan
People from Gyeongju
Sportspeople from North Gyeongsang Province
21st-century South Korean women